The 1997–98 Michigan Wolverines men's ice hockey team represented the University of Michigan in intercollegiate college ice hockey during the 1997–98 NCAA Division I men's ice hockey season. The head coach was Red Berenson and the team captain was Matt Herr. The team played its home games in the Yost Ice Arena on the university campus in Ann Arbor, Michigan.  The team finished second in the Central Collegiate Hockey Association regular season, lost in the semifinals of the CCHA Tournament and won the 1998 NCAA Division I Men's Ice Hockey Tournament.

Season
The team was led by Bill Muckalt who was a Division I All-Americans selection of the American Hockey Coaches Association. Muckalt was the only first team Central Collegiate Hockey Association All-Conference selection.

Marty Turco set the current career (1995–98) win (127) and shutouts (15) records. His wins total is an NCAA Division I national record:  The team established the current NCAA Division I record for single-season overtime wins (6).  Muckalt led the conference in game-winning goals (6) and was the team's highest ranked scorer with 43 points which was second in the league.

The team concluded the Central Collegiate Hockey Association 30-game regular season one point behind the 21–5–4 conference championship Michigan State team with a 22–7–1 record.  In the first round, number two seeded Michigan defeated Notre Dame in a three-game series by scores of 2–4, 2–1 (overtime) and 4–3.  In the second round, the team lost to number three Ohio State 4–2.

In the 12-team 1998 NCAA Division I Men's Ice Hockey Tournament as the number three seed in the west, the team posted the following victories en route to the championship:  Princeton University 2–1, North Dakota 4–3, New Hampshire 4–0 and Boston College 3–2 in overtime.  Marty Turco set Frozen Four career records with 9 wins and 2 career shutouts, which have both been eclipsed. Scott Clemmensen has totalled 10 career tournament victories in a career ending in 2001 for Boston College, while Cory Schneider compiled three tournament shutouts for Boston College in a career that ended in 2007.

Departures

Recruiting

Roster

Standings

Schedule and results

|-
!colspan=12 style=";" | Regular Season

|-
!colspan=12 style=";" | 

|-
!colspan=12 style=";" | 

|-
!colspan=12 style=";" | 

|- align="center" bgcolor="#e0e0e0"
|colspan=12|Michigan Won Series 2-1

|-
!colspan=12 style=";" |

1998 National Championship

Scoring statistics

Goaltending statistics

Rankings

USCHO did not release a poll in week 24.

Awards and honors

Players drafted into the NHL

1998 NHL Entry Draft

† incoming freshman

See also
1998 NCAA Division I Men's Ice Hockey Tournament
List of NCAA Division I Men's Ice Hockey Tournament champions

References

External links
Official University of Michigan Athletics website
Official Site

Michigan Wolverines men's ice hockey seasons
Michigan
Michigan
Michigan
Michigan
Michigan